Antiphospholipid syndrome, familial is a protein that in humans is encoded by the ATPLS gene.

References